Below is the order of battle for the Amoy Operation fought May 10–12, 1938, part of a campaign by the Imperial Japanese Navy to blockade the Republic of China during the Second Sino-Japanese War.

Japan 

5th Fleet
Vice Admiral Koichi Shiozawa
 9th Sentai
 1 Myōkō-class heavy cruiser (10 × 8-in. main battery, 16 × 24-in. torpedo tubes, 33.75 knots)
 Myōkō
 1 Kuma-class light cruiser (7 × 5.5-in. main battery, 8 × 24-in. torpedo tubes, 31.75 knots):
 Tama
 10th Sentai
 2 Tenryū-class light cruisers (4 × 5.5-in. main battery, 6 × 21-in. torpedo tubes, 33 knots):
 Tenryū
 Tatsuta
 1st Gunboat Unit
 4 gunboats(?)
 1st Air Sentai
 Fleet carrier Kaga
 90 aircraft
 Fighter Daitai: Nakajima A2N, Type 95 Mitsubishi A5M
 Bomber Daitai:  Aichi D1A1s, A2's dive bombers
 Attack Daitai: Mitsubishi B2M, Type 96 Yokosuka B4Y1 torpedo bombers
 3rd Air Sentai
 Kamoi seaplane tender
 12 aircraft (probably Nakajima E8N Type 95  "Dave" Recon Seaplane)
 2nd Combined SNLF
 Yokosuka 2nd SNLF
 Kure 3rd SNLF
 Sasebo 7th SNLF
 Kinmen (Quemoy) Garrison
 1st Garrison Unit

Notes
 Earlier in the Shanghai campaign the 1st Air Sentai had an escort of a 30th Tai of 4 destroyers. Formerly Kamoi had an escort of 28th Tai of 4 destroyers also. It is likely they had similar if not the same escorts here.  
 From: History of The Sino-Japanese War (1937–1945)
 5/10 11 Ships and 18 planes bombarded Ho-to and Ao-tou. 20 motor boats landed infantry at Wu-tung.
 5/11 More landings at Huang-tso and Ta-tao. 3 destroyers and 2 Gunboats attacked the fortress there to cover the landings. This indicates there was at least one Tai of destroyers with this operation.

China 

Amoy Area
Chen Yi, Director, Fukien Pacification HQ
 75th Division – Han Wen-ying
 Amoy fortress Command – Kao Hsien-shen
 Pai-shih Fortress
 Yu-tse-wei Fortress (naval garrison)
 2 batteries of fortress garrison forces
 Hui-li-shan battery
 Pan-shih battery

References

Sources 
 
 
 

Amoy
Amoy